Jaswinder Singh Bains (born 1 April 1975), better known by his stage name Jazzy B is an Indo-Canadian Punjabi singer and songwriter.

Early life and career
Jazzy B was born in a Jat family of Jalandher, Punjab, India. When he was five years old, his family moved to Surrey, British Columbia, Canada. 
His first album Gugiyan Da Jora was released in 1993. The rhythm was played by Sukhshinder Shinda who suggested that he move to England if he wanted a prominent career in Punjabi music.
He is a big fan of the late singer Kuldeep Manak, which is one of the reasons why Jazzy's album, Maharajas, released in 2011,  with Kuldeep's son, Yudhvir, also a singer, is a tribute to Kuldeep Manak, with some of Kuldeep's original vocals retained, and many other songs sung by Jazzy and Yudhvir, are also a tribute to Kuldeep Manak.

Jazzy has released 12 studio albums, and two religious ones. He has collaborated on many tracks.

Film career
In 2000 Jazzy made his film debut in Shaheed Udham Singh.
In 2006 he appeared in Sunny Deol's movie Teesri Aankh: The Hidden Camera with Amisha Patel in song Chug De Punjabi.

In 2012 he made his debut with movie Best of Luck as an actor with Punjabi singer and actor Gippy Grewal and Miss India Universe 2008 Simran Kaur Mundi. The shooting of this film commenced in Vancouver, British Columbia, Canada in May 2012. He made special appearance in Diljit Dosanjh's Jatt & Juliet 2 in 2013.

In 2014, he appeared in Romeo Ranjha.
In a news story published in April, it was revealed that while doing stunts for Romeo Ranjha, Jazzy underwent serious injuries wherein he even had "near-death" experience. He was quoted as saying, "I literally left my body. I could feel everyone trying to resuscitate me. I remember my whole life flashing before my eyes, and surprisingly, I wasn't thinking about winning awards or anything like that. The only thing I cared about was that I wanted to live because I did not want to leave my family so soon."

In 2014 he made a special appearance in Dharmendra's and Gippy Grewal's movie Double Di Trouble.

In 2015 he featured in title song "Zalim Dilli"of movie Dilliwali Zaalim Girlfriend  with Hard Kaur.

In 2019 he worked on the Akshay Kumar starer Kesari as a playback singer on the song

In 2020 he featured in song "Gallan Kardi" with Saif Ali Khan for movie Jawaani Jaaneman.

In 2022, he appeared in a song "ghaint galbaat" with Zareen Khan in punjabi movie Posti. In 2022, he also appeared as a cop in suspense thriller punjabi movie Snowman: The Dark Side of Canada along with Neeru Bajwa, Rana Ranbir and Arshi Khatkar.

Work
From his music video "Surma" John Abraham started his modelling career in 2000.
In 2001 his song "Oh Kehri" from the album of same name featured Celina Jaitley. Mahek Chahal featured in his songs and videos "Jindey" and "Chak De Boli". He is known for his song "Dil Luteya" with Apache Indian from his album Romeo. Esha Gupta featured in his song "Glassy" from the album Rambo in 2008. Surveen Chawla appeared in his song "Naag 2" in 2010.

He sung a song named "Fukraa" for Emraan Hashmi starrer movie Rush in 2012.
In 2013 he sung a song "Jugni" for Jimmy Sheirgill, Irrfan Khan, Soha Ali Khan, and Mahi Gill starrer Saheb, Biwi Aur Gangster Returns.

In 2014 Surveen Chawla once again appeared in his Duet song "Mitran De Boot". In 2014 he also sung for movie Shaadi Ke Side Effects starring Farhan Akhtar and Vidya Balan.

In 2015 he worked with international rapper Snoop Dogg for the song "Most Wanted" which is featured in MTV India. His old song "Sat Rangey" used in the background of the Hollywood movie Deadpool  in 2016. 
He is the first South Asian entertainer to have his name added to the BC Entertainment Hall of Fame Star Walk in Vancouver.

In 2016 he sung a song "Love The Way You Dance" for movie Tutak Tutak Tutiya starring Prabhu Deva, Tamannaah and Sonu Sood.

In 2017 Bigg Boss Season 10 contestant Lopamudra Raut was featured in his song Crazy Ya from album Folk 'N' Funky 2.

In 2019 he sung the song "Ajj Singh Garjega" for Akshay Kumar's movie Kesari.
In 2019 he worked on the Akshay Kumar starer Kesari as a playback singer on the song

In 2020, his song "Jine Mera Dil Luteya" recreated as "Gaallan Kardi" with Jyotica Tangri & Mumzy Stranger for Saif Ali Khan, Tabu & Alaya Furniturewala starrer Jawaani Jaaneman.
He appeared as a Judge in Zee Punjabi "Sa Re Ga Ma Pa" with Sonu Kakkar, Jaidev Kumar and show was mentoring by Gurdas Mann.

Discography

Religious albums

Soundtracks

Singles

Duo collaborations

Television

Filmography

Awards and nominations

References

External links

Official website
Jazzy B Music Profile on PunjabiCinema.Org

1975 births
Living people
Punjabi people
Indian Sikhs
People from Shaheed Bhagat Singh Nagar district
People from Abbotsford, British Columbia
Punjabi-language singers
Indian emigrants to Canada
Canadian people of Indian descent
Canadian people of Punjabi descent
Canadian Sikhs
Canadian musicians of Indian descent
Bhangra (music) musicians
Musicians from British Columbia